Tributary is a ballet made by Robert La Fosse and Robert Garland to Mozart's Divertimento No. 11 in D, K. 251 (1776). The premiere took place on Thursday, 25 May 2000, as part of New York City Ballet's Diamond Project at the New York State Theater, Lincoln Center.

Original cast 
   
Kyra Nichols
 
Donald Williams

Footnotes

External links

reviews  
  
The New York Times review by Jack Anderson, June 1, 2000
The New York Times review by Anna Kisselgoff, May 27, 2000
 
The New York Times review by Anna Kisselgoff, May 18, 2001
The New York Times review by Jennifer Dunning, January 18, 2002

Ballets by Robert Garland
Ballets by Robert La Fosse
Ballets to the music of Wolfgang Amadeus Mozart
2000 ballet premieres
New York City Ballet repertory
New York City Ballet Diamond Project